The 9th Canadian Folk Music Awards were presented at the University of Calgary Theatre in Calgary, Alberta on November 10, 2013. The ceremony was hosted by the CBC's Shelagh Rogers and musician Benoit Bourque.  Overall, 70 artists and groups were announced as nominees in 19 categories who hailed from eight provinces and two territories in Canada.  Two additional special category award recipients were announced honouring this year's Unsung Hero and Folk Music Canada's Innovator Award.

Nominees and recipients
Recipients are listed first and highlighted in boldface.

Other special awards
Two special awards were handed out during the gala. Manitoba-based industry stalwart Mitch Podolak was honoured by his folk community peers as this year's Unsung Hero, a special award that highlights the exceptional contributions of an individual, group, or organization to the Canadian folk music scene. Victoria's Daniel Lapp is the recipient of the Folk Music Canada's Innovator Award for his work as a teacher, leader and song collector.

References

External links
Canadian Folk Music Awards

08
Canadian Folk Music Awards
Canadian Folk Music Awards
Canadian Folk Music Awards
Canadian Folk Music Awards